General Legge may refer to:

Arthur Legge (British Army officer) (1800–1890), British Army general
Barnwell R. Legge (1891–1949), U.S. Army brigadier general
James Gordon Legge (1863–1947) was an Australian Army lieutenant general
Stanley Legge (1900–1977), Australian Army major general
William Kaye Legge (1869–1946), British Army brigadier general